Troy Dillinger (born February 28) is an American musician, comedian, actor/writer/producer/director, community activist, graphic & web designer, and owner of an advertising & marketing agency in Austin, Texas. He is best known for his work as a singer-songwriter in the US and Europe, for founding Save Austin Music, creating [austin swim] and Adult Swim Presents, and creating, producing, writing, and hosting Austin Variety Show.

Early life
Dillinger was born in Canton, Ohio and grew up in Austin, Texas.

Career
Troy was given his first guitar for Christmas when he was 13 years old, and was playing in Austin nightclubs by age 16. His first tour was in 1985 at the age of 18 with Dino Lee. He then co-founded BAND FROM HELL, an underground punk rock band that achieved much acclaim, but never signed a record deal.

In 1992, he co-founded Del Dragons, a roots rock band reminiscent of the Rolling Stones and Faces. The band broke up shortly after its first full-length release in 1997 and toured the US and Europe as "Troy Dillinger & Del Dragons" through 1999. In late 1999, he began performing as Troy Dillinger with a rotating lineup of band members which included Hunt Sales, Ian McLagan, and others.

In 1998, he began acting and landed small roles on movies such as American Outlaws, The New Guy, and Miss Congeniality.

In 2005, he released the award-winning Dirty & Harry CD/DVD full-length recording and film festival, which won awards from the Austin Music Network and The Austin Chronicle. The same year, he created Austin Swim, an adult swim viewing party which led to the creation of Adult Swim Presents.

In 2008, Dillinger severed his ties with Adult Swim and created The Austin Variety Show, a local television show which features Austin music, comedy, burlesque, and a live game show with members of the audience. The show aired on KBVO (TV) from 2010-2013 before moving to the internet.

In January 2017, Troy moved to Los Angeles, California, where he continued performing as a standup comic, while shopping Austin Variety Show's Game Show component as "LOSER: The Game Show". He resumed acting and has been successful since, appearing in scores of movies, series, videos and commercials.

Discography

 BAND FROM HELL (1988)
 Lucky 13 (1990)
 Del Dragons (1994)
 Del Dragons - Southern Jumbo (1997)
 Troy Dillinger & Del Dragons - Live In Paris (1999)
 Troy Dillinger - And A Guitar (1999)
 Troy Dillinger - Vivre (2000)
 Dillinger - Live At Antone's (2002)
 Troy Dillinger - Fine So Far (2003)
 Troy Dillinger - Dirty & Harry (2005)

References

External links

Austin Variety Show

"Confessions of a Mind on Overdive" Austin Chronicle

1967 births
Living people
Writers from Canton, Ohio
People from Austin, Texas
Male actors from Ohio
Male actors from Austin, Texas
American male film actors
American male musicians
American male comedians
American male television actors
American television hosts
Television producers from Texas
Comedians from Ohio
Musicians from Canton, Ohio
Actors from Canton, Ohio
21st-century American comedians